Crocidosema marcidellum is a moth of the family Tortricidae. It was first described by Lord Walsingham in 1907. It is endemic to the Hawaiian islands of Kauai and Oahu.

The wingspan ranges up to 20 mm.

The larvae feed on the fruit of Hibiscus arnottianus and the petiole of Abutilon sandwicense. The petioles in which larvae are boring become considerably swollen. Full-grown larvae are about 12 mm long and dirty whitish or yellowish with a rosy tinge.

The pupa is about 7 mm long and yellowish brown.

External links

Eucosmini
Endemic moths of Hawaii
Moths described in 1907